Moxley may refer to:
 Moxley, Georgia, United States
 Moxley, West Midlands, England
 Moxley & Co., a corporate nominee for the issuance of ADRs
 Mount Moxley, a peak in the Royal Society Range, Antarctica

People with the surname
 William Moxley (1851–1938), American politician
 Martha Moxley (1960–1975), American murder victim
 Jennifer Moxley (born 1964), American poet
 Jon Moxley (born 1985), American professional wrestler
 Sue Moxley (disambiguation), multiple people